Alphonso Lunt (September 6, 1837 – December 18, 1917) was a sergeant in the Union Army and a Medal of Honor recipient for his actions at the First Battle of Lexington during the American Civil War.

Medal of Honor citation
Rank and organization: Sergeant, Company F, 38th Massachusetts Infantry. Place and date: At Opequon Creek, Virginia, September 19, 1864. Entered service at: Cambridge, Massachusetts. Birth: Berwick, Maine. Date of issue: May 10, 1894.

Citation:

Carried his flag to the most advanced position where, left almost alone close to the enemy's lines he refused their demand to surrender, withdrew at great personal peril, and saved his flag.

See also

 List of American Civil War Medal of Honor recipients: G–L

References

External links
 

1837 births
1917 deaths
United States Army Medal of Honor recipients
Union Army soldiers
People of Maine in the American Civil War
People from Berwick, Maine
American Civil War recipients of the Medal of Honor